Lasioglossum actinosum is a species of sweat bee in the family Halictidae.

References

Further reading

 

actinosum
Articles created by Qbugbot
Insects described in 1924